Marianth Cuervo Baute (born 21 February 1997) is a Venezuelan karateka. She won one of the bronze medals in the women's kumite -68 kg event at the 2019 Pan American Games held in Lima, Peru.

In 2018, she won the silver medal in the women's kumite 68 kg event at the Central American and Caribbean Games held in Barranquilla, Colombia.

In June 2021, she competed at the World Olympic Qualification Tournament held in Paris, France hoping to qualify for the 2020 Summer Olympics in Tokyo, Japan. In November 2021, she competed in the women's 68 kg event at the World Karate Championships held in Dubai, United Arab Emirates.

She won one of the bronze medals in the women's 68 kg event at the 2022 Bolivarian Games held in Valledupar, Colombia. She also won one of the bronze medals in her event at the 2022 South American Games held in Asunción, Paraguay.

Achievements

References 

Living people
1997 births
Place of birth missing (living people)
Venezuelan female karateka
Pan American Games medalists in karate
Pan American Games bronze medalists for Venezuela
Medalists at the 2019 Pan American Games
Karateka at the 2019 Pan American Games
South American Games gold medalists for Venezuela
South American Games bronze medalists for Venezuela
South American Games medalists in karate
Competitors at the 2018 South American Games
Competitors at the 2022 South American Games
Competitors at the 2018 Central American and Caribbean Games
Central American and Caribbean Games silver medalists for Venezuela
Central American and Caribbean Games medalists in karate
21st-century Venezuelan women